Mil Gayee Manzil Mujhe is a 1989 Indian Hindi-language film directed by Moeen Amjad, starring Mithun Chakraborty, Moon Moon Sen, Shakti Kapoor and Amrish Puri.

Plot
Vijay is an upright and laborious young man. He works as a stunt man for films. Yearning for love drove him towards Renu, but before his yearning fructifies Renu goes out his life with a millionaire. Dinesh Singh his bruised heart find solace in the arms of Kamini but she comes out to be perfidious and avaricious for money. It makes Vijay realize the importance of money and in order to earn money, he joins the gang Shamsher Chattopadhyay, an underworld don, having come to know that Kamini has married a rich diamond merchant of Kathmandu, he goes their presenting himself as a wealthy businessman of Uganda, fond of collecting rare gems and diamonds, to take revenge from her. Vijay traps the avaricious Kamini in his clutches, but before he could avenge his insult and humiliation, Renu blocks his maneuver, Renu is the sister of Dinesh. This information banishes all his misconceptions regarding Renu from his heart and he again starts trying to win her love. Dinesh throws a party to announce the betrothal of Vijay's sister Asha with Ravi. Vijay takes away Asha from the party when he discovers that Asha has fallen with Ravi, another gang leader of the underworld. On reaching his suite in the hotel, where he is staying, he is shocked to find Shamsher Chattopadhyay and his henchmen waiting for him. Asha is very much heart to know that her brother works for Shamsher and he has amassed wealth through illegal means. Vijay promises Asha that he will toil hard even starve, to earn through honest means and leave the gang of Shamsher forever, but Shamsher exterminates those who dare to leave his gang.

Cast
Mithun Chakraborty as Vijay Kumar Malhotra
Moon Moon Sen as Renu
Shakti Kapoor as Inspector Ravi
Shobha as Asha, Vijay's sister
Urmila Bhatt as Vijay and Asha's mother
Girish Karnad as Dinesh
Kalpana Iyer as Kamini
Amrish Puri as Shamsher Chattopadhyay

Soundtrack

References

External links

1989 films
1980s Hindi-language films
Indian action films
Films scored by R. D. Burman
1989 action films